Stoßtrupp-Hitler or Stosstrupp-Hitler ("Shock Troop-Hitler") was a small, short-lived bodyguard unit set up specifically for Adolf Hitler in 1923. Notable members included Rudolf Hess, Julius Schreck, Joseph Berchtold, Emil Maurice, Erhard Heiden, Ulrich Graf, and Bruno Gesche.

Formation
In the earliest days of the Nazi Party, the leadership realized that a bodyguard unit composed of zealous and reliable men was needed. Ernst Röhm formed a guard formation from the 19.Granatwerfer-Kompanie; from this formation the Sturmabteilung (SA) soon evolved. In early 1923, Hitler ordered a separate small bodyguard unit formed. It was dedicated to his service rather than "a suspect mass" of the party, such as the SA. Originally the unit was composed of only eight men, commanded by Julius Schreck and Joseph Berchtold. It was designated the Stabswache (staff guard). The Stabswache were issued unique badges, but at this point the Stabswache was still under overall SA control. Schreck resurrected the use of the Totenkopf (i.e. skull) as the unit's insignia, a symbol various elite forces had used throughout the Prussian kingdom and the later German Empire.

In May 1923, the unit was renamed Stoßtrupp–Hitler. The unit numbered no more than 20 members at that time. All were considered Hitler loyalists. According to the Historical Lexicon of Bavaria the unit later had around 100 members. On 9 November 1923, the Stoßtrupp, along with the SA and several other Nazi paramilitary units, took part in the abortive Beer Hall Putsch in Munich. In the aftermath, Hitler was imprisoned and his party and all associated formations, including the Stoßtrupp, were disbanded.

Notable members
 Rudolf Hess
 Julius Schreck
 Joseph Berchtold
 Emil Maurice
 Erhard Heiden
 Ulrich Graf
 Bruno Gesche
 Christian Weber
 Karl Fiehler
 Walter Buch
 Hermann Fobke
 Karl Laforce
 Wilhelm Laforce
 Josef Gerum
 Hans Kallenbach
 Philipp Kitzinger
 Alois Rosenwink

See also
 Schutzstaffel
 Führerbegleitkommando
 Adolf Hitler's bodyguard

References

Citations

Bibliography
 
 
 

 

1923 establishments in Germany
Adolf Hitler
Military wings of fascist parties
Early Nazism (–1933)
Nazi Party organizations
Military units and formations established in 1923